Theydon Mount is a village and a civil parish in the Epping Forest district of the county of Essex, England. The village is notable for the Grade I Listed Elizabethan mansion, Hill Hall.

History 
The name "Theydon" is thought to mean 'valley where thatch (material) grows'. The word "Mount" derives from the hill on which it is located. Theydon Mount has been called Theydon Paulyn, Theydon Lessington, and Theydon Briwes in the past. The names from the former lords of the manor. The name Thoydon Mount has also been used. Theydon Bois, Garnon and Mount were recorded in the Domesday Book as 'Taindena' and 'Teidana'.

Geography 
Theydon Mount is close to the M25 motorway. The parish, which includes the hamlet of Mount End, has an area of 632 hectares and a population of 163 people. Nearby settlements include the town of Epping, the villages of Theydon Bois, Stapleford Tawney, Theydon Garnon, the hamlets of Hobbs Cross, Passingford Bridge, Mount End and Fiddlers Hamlet.

Landmarks 

Hill Hall is a Grade I Listed country house. It was built in 1557–1558 for Sir Thomas Smith. The house was occupied in the 1930s by Lord Edward Hay.  Theydon Mount has a church called St Michael which was completed in 1614 by Sir William Smith and is Grade I Listed. The original church was St Michael and St Stephen which burnt down in 1611. Mount Hall was near to the site of Hill Hall, there are no remains of it.

Education 
Theydon Mount had a school which closed in 1942, the children were transferred to Theydon Garnon.

References

External links 
 

Villages in Essex
Civil parishes in Essex
Epping Forest District